The Igagoe vendetta was a vengeance incident in Japan in 1634, where the murder of a retainer was avenged by his older brother. The event happened in the town of Iga-Ueno near Iga Pass. The vendetta is known as one of the three major vendetta incidents in Japan, alongside the Revenge of the Soga Brothers and the Akō vendetta (by the 47 Rōnin).

History 
In 1630, in the fiefdom of Okayama, Watanabe Gendayū, a favorite retainer of Ikeda Tadao, was murdered by Kawai Matagorō "because he had rebuffed Matagorō's amorous advances". Becoming a murderer out of jealousy for a childhood friend, Kawai Matagoro fled to the Edo city where hatamoto Ando Masayoshi sheltered him. Tadao tried to bring him to justice, but failed. When Tadao died in 1632, he asked: "For my memorial service, above everything else offer on my behalf the head of Kawai Matagorō." After that Kawai Matagorō was officially ordered by bakufu to exile. As it was the shogun's orders, a samurai had to submit to preserve the honor of the family. This gave Watanabe Kazuma an opportunity for revenge. He was 18 years old at the time; he discharged from the Ikeda family for whom he served and began his search for Kawai Matagoro. Watanabe eventually located him in the neighborhood of Iga-Ueno. By now, Watanabe Kazuma had been joined in his revenge by his sister's husband, famous swordsman Araki Mataemon.

"On the seventh day of the eleventh month of 1634", Watanabe Kazuma, Araki Mataemon, and two other men waited for Kawai Matagoro at the Kagiya crossroads in Iga-Ueno. They had been informed of Matagoro's route from Osaka. Mataemon and his followers waited for Matagoro in a nearby shop. When they arrived, Mataemon killed Matagoro's uncle, Kawai Jinzaemon, and the followers who surrounded Matagoro. Historian Stephen Turnbull wrote, that:

Vendetta needed to be reported to a government to be regarded a lawful action, or all the participants were cast as criminals. The participants of Igagoe vendetta weren't regarded as criminals, so it was probably reported as the law commanded. "The full story [...] eventually involved not only lower-ranking samurai but the more exalted lords, or daimyo, of at least two feudal domains, and eventually the Tokugawa central government in Edo [...] The whole incident and the vendetta that followed were deemed of sufficient importance that they were recorded in the official chronicle of the central government, The True History of the Tokugawa (Tokugawa Jikki)."

In culture 

The event was told in several novels, plays, and movies.

Kabuki
"Igagoe Dochu Sugoroku"

Movies
 , 1925
 Vendetta for a Samurai, 1952
For the full list see Japanese article :ja:鍵屋の辻の決闘.

References

Revenge
1634 in Japan
Assassinations in Japan
Feuds
Japanese folklore
Traditional stories